This article contains past rosters  of the Galatasaray S.K. (men's volleyball) team.

1990 Era

1990-91

1991-92
Roster
{|
|-valign="top"
|
  Milan Džavoronok
|
 Coach:  Enver Göçener
  Milanov CSKA Sofía (Bulgaria)

1992-93
Roster

1993-94

1994-95

1995-96
Roster

1996-97
Roster

1997-98
Roster

1998-99
Roster

1999-00
Roster

2000 Era

2000-01
Roster

2001-02
Roster

2002-03
Roster

2003-04
Roster

2004-05
Roster

2005-06
Roster

2006-07
Roster

2007-08
Roster

2008-09
Roster

2009-10
Roster

2010 Era

2010-11
Roster

2011-12
Roster

2012-13
Roster

2013-14
Roster

2014-15
Roster

2015-16
Roster

2016-17
Roster

2017-18
Roster

2018-19
Roster

2019-20
Roster

2020 Era

2020-21
Roster

2021-22
Roster

References

 Galatasaray Istanbul » players __ Volleybox.net

External links
 Official Galatasaray Volleyball Branch Website 
 Turkish Volleyball Federastion Official Website 

Galatasaray S.K. (men's volleyball)